Arkansas Highway 154 (also called AR 154 and Hwy. 154) is a  east-west state highway in the western portion of the U.S. state of Arkansas. The highway begins at Arkansas Highway 27 in Yell County northeast of Danville and runs east to Arkansas Highway 113 in Conway County east of Oppelo. Highway 154 is maintained by the Arkansas State Highway and Transportation Department.

Route description

Highway 154 begins at a junction with Highway 27 in unincorporated Yell County northeast of Danville. From here, the route heads east through a rural area to Mount George, where it meets Highway 28. The highway continues east from Mount George to an intersection with Highway 7 in Centerville. It leaves Centerville to the east, passing through the community of Liberty Hall before meeting Highway 155 in a farmed region. Past Highway 155, the road dips south around Winthrop Rockefeller Lake, running through the communities of New Neely and Cotton Town before reaching the Conway County line at the Petit Jean River.

Upon crossing into Conway County, Highway 154 heads south to meet Highway 247 in Pontoon. The highway leaves Pontoon to the east, following a crooked route into Petit Jean State Park. After meeting Highway 155 for a second time, the road roughly parallels Cedar Creek eastward through the park. It passes to the south of Lake Bailey and Petit Jean Park Airport before leaving the park to the east. At the Arkansas River, the highway turns south before curving east toward Oppelo. After meeting Highway 9 in central Oppelo, Highway 154 leaves the city and terminates at Highway 113.

History
A road between Petit Jean State Park and Oppelo was first shown on state highway maps in 1936; this road was marked as Highway 154 in 1937 and was paved by 1940. Between 1942 and 1945, the Yell County section of what is now Highway 154 was added to the state highway system as part of Highway 80. In 1956, Highway 154 was extended into Yell County along the route of Highway 80; its routing has not changed since. The highway was paved between Centerville and Petit Jean State Park in 1960, and the remainder of the route was paved by 1968.

Major intersections

See also

 List of state highways in Arkansas

References

External links

154
Transportation in Conway County, Arkansas
Transportation in Yell County, Arkansas